Edna Wilson-Mosley (1925 - 2014) was a prominent politician, civil rights activist, and educator in Denver and Aurora, Colorado. Wilson-Mosley was a civil rights specialist for Colorado’s Civil Rights Commission. She was the only Black founder of Women's Bank and served on the Board of Directors. She was married to John Mosley, a highly respected and original Tuskegee Airman.

Biography

Early life
Edna Wilson was born May 31, 1925 in Helena, Arkansas. Her mother and grandmother were both named Edna, as well as her daughter, and a granddaughter. Her sister-in-law is the mother of Congresswoman Maxine Waters.

She attended Manual High School and the University of Northern Colorado in 1943. 

During World War II, she worked in the defense industry.

Wilson-Mosley and her husband moved to Aurora in 1965, when Mosley transferred to Lowry Air Force Base. They had four children together.

She returned to college and graduated in the first graduating class at Metropolitan State College in Denver in 1969. At the time she was a "non-traditional" student: 44 years old, a mother, and a career woman.

Activism and career
In 1954, Wilson-Mosley visited relatives in Helena, Arkansas and on the day they returned to Denver, a white man on the train platform asked them to leave. She refused and spent the night in jail. She told this story as an explanation and inciting incident for her lifelong involvement in racial equity. 

From 1969-1970, Wilson-Mosley worked for the Colorado Civil Rights Commission as a civil rights specialist, and as the community relations coordinator from 1970-1974. She then worked for the Colorado State and Department of Personnel as the assistant state affirmative action coordinator until 1978, and then went to the University of Denver as affirmative action director.

Wilson-Mosley was a founder of The Women's Bank, now called Colorado Business Bank.  In 1975, she borrowed $1,000 from a credit union without telling her husband to help finance a bank that would cater to women. It was uncommon for women to hold bank accounts without their husbands' permission, and Wilson-Mosley wanted to improve access and opportunities for women. Along with 49 other contributors, the organizing group raised $50,000 to establish the bank. At that time she was the only African American on the organizing team.

In 1991, Wilson-Mosley was the first Black city council member in Aurora, Colorado, where she served for 12 years. She was influential in the community by sponsoring anti-gang programs, local gun control legislation, and racial equality efforts.

Community involvement
Wilson-Mosley was an active member of the Colorado community. She was the member of the following organizations:
Women's Forum Colorado - Best Sustaining Public Affairs Program, Colorado Broadcasting Association 1972
Co-chairman of the Denver/Nairobi Sister City Committee, and President of Denver Sister Cities Int. 1976-80
Board of directors and founding member, Women's Bank NA Denver, 1978-80
National Social Action Community
Life member, Delta Sigma Theta sorority, 1979-81
Director, Higher Education Affirmative Action
National Association of Affirmative Action Officers
Colorado Black Women Political Action
Delta Sigma Theta Denver Alumnae Chapter
Director, Fitzsimmons Redevelopment Authority
Director, Aurora Economic Development Council
National Association for the Advancement of Colored People (NAACP)

Death and afterward
Edna passed away on August 26, 2014.

Recognition
1977 - Lola M. Parker Achievement Award, Iota Phi Lambda Far Western region
1978 - Headliner Award, Women in Communications, Inc.
1978 - Appreciation Award, National Association of Black Accountants
1979 - Distinguished Service Award, International Student Organizations at the University of Denver
1984 - Businesswoman of the Year, Aurora Area Business and Professional Women
1986 - Distinguished Alumnus, Metropolitan State College
1988 - Humanitarian Award, Martin Luther King, Jr. Holiday Commission
1989 - Juanita Gray Community Service Award
1992 - Blacks in Colorado Hall of Fame Inductees
2004 - Honorary doctorate from Colorado State University

The Central Park neighborhood was renamed in 2020, and Mosley was one of the options. It was ultimately not chosen.

Aurora Public Schools opened the Edna and John W. Mosley P-8 on October 1, 2015.

John and Edna Mosley Scholarship Fund 
After years of serving the community, friends and community members raised money to present to the Mosley's to allow them to go on vacation abroad to enjoy themselves. The community raised thousands of dollars to honor and show thanks to the Mosley's philanthropy throughout the years. The Mosley's instead had a different plan for this money: they agreed to accept the money raised, if only they could start a scholarship fund with it, instead of a vacation for themselves. Since its start in 2002, this scholarship fund has helped numerous African American students from the Denver-Metro area, equaling in $28,000 worth of scholarship dollars given to the recipients. The requirements for this scholarship include: one must be African American, have a desire to further their education in a University, College or another accredited post-secondary school and must have accumulated a GPA of 2.5 of higher.  This scholarship fund looks for students who take charge of their lives to better them, such as maintaining good grades and having leadership roles, once the finalist are accepted the scholarship board will then hold interviews to ensure that the Mosley scholarship is awarded to the perfect candidate to honor the Mosley's. This scholarship fund is now the largest and oldest community fund in the entire state of Colorado. Following his death, the Mosley family asked the public to please not send the family flowers, but instead donate a dollar to his scholarship fund to honor one of his life goals to help African American students achieve their full potential in post-secondary education.

References/Notes and references

African-American activists
American civil rights activists
African-American educators
University of Northern Colorado alumni
Metropolitan State University of Denver alumni
African-American politicians

1925 births
2014 deaths